is a Japanese samurai family of direct descent from Minamoto no Morifusa of the Murakami-Genji (Minamoto clan).

History
They were prominent shugo-daimyō in Harima during the Sengoku period.

During the Ōnin no ran (1467–1477), Akamatsu Masanori was one of the chief generals of the Hosokawa clan.

The head of the clan at Shizuoka in Suruga Province became a kazoku baron in 1887.

The Shinmen clan were a branch of the Akamatsu.

Select members of the clan

 Akamatsu Norimura (1277–1350).
 Akamatsu Norisuke (1314–1371).
 Akamatsu Mitsusuke (1381–1441).
 Akamatsu Sadaura
 Akamatsu Masanori (d.1577)
 Akamatsu Yoshisuke
 Akamatsu Norifusa (1559–1598)

See also
 Akamatsu Tōshōin
 Sesson Yūbai (1290–1348)

Notes

References
 Hall, John Whitney. (1999). The Cambridge History of Japan: Medieval Japan, Vol. 3. Cambridge: Cambridge University Press. ;  OCLC 165440083
 Nussbaum, Louis-Frédéric and Käthe Roth. (2005). Japan Encyclopedia. Cambridge: Harvard University Press. ; OCLC 48943301

Japanese clans
Minamoto clan